Defending champion Martina Navratilova and her partner Pam Shriver defeated Steffi Graf and Gabriela Sabatini in the final, 6–2, 6–1 to win the women's doubles tennis title at the 1987 French Open. It was Navratilova's fourth consecutive French Open title in women's doubles.

Navratilova and Andrea Temesvári were the reigning champions, but Temesvári did not participate this year.

Seeds

Draw

Finals

Top half

Section 1

Section 2

Bottom half

Section 3

Section 4

References
1987 French Open – Women's draws and results at the International Tennis Federation

Women's Doubles
French Open by year – Women's doubles
1987 in women's tennis
1987 in French women's sport